The R. A. Knight–Eugene Lacount House is a historic house in Somerville, Massachusetts.  The two story Second Empire house was built c. 1870; its second owner was Eugene Lacount, an American Civil War veteran.  The house's mansard roof is pierced by recessed dormers with segmented arch dormers.  The cornices of the roof, projecting bay tops, and front porch are all studded with modillions, and the front porch features turned posts with decorative brackets.

The house was listed on the National Register of Historic Places in 1989.

Gallery

See also
National Register of Historic Places listings in Somerville, Massachusetts

References

Houses on the National Register of Historic Places in Somerville, Massachusetts